Chin-Chou is the Wade–Giles romanization of several cities in China:

 Jinzhou, Liaoning
 Jinzhou, Hebei

Other
 Chincheu or Quanzhou, Fujian, China
 Chinchou, a Pokémon
 Chiu Chin (1875–1907), Chinese revolutionary, feminist, and writer